United Nations Security Council resolution 747, adopted unanimously on 24 March 1992, after recalling Resolution 696 (1991) and noting a report by the Secretary-General Boutros Boutros-Ghali, the Council approved the report concerning observations of elections and an enlargement for the United Nations Angola Verification Mission II (UNAVEM II) in Angola.

By accepting the proposals, an additional 100 observers were sent to Angola and also tasking UNAVEM II with monitoring registration of voters, electoral campaigning and the verification of election results. However, it had very little resources in order to carry out its mandate.

The Council called on all the Angolan parties to co-operate with the Special Representative of the Secretary-General and abide by the principles set out in the Bicesse Accords. It also requested the parties finalise political, financial and legal preparations ahead of proposed September 1992 multi-party elections, encouraging Member States to contribute to the United Nations programmes to provide assistance and support the election process.

See also
 Angolan Civil War
 Angolan legislative election, 1992
 Angolan presidential election, 1992
 List of United Nations Security Council Resolutions 701 to 800 (1991–1993)
 United Nations Angola Verification Mission III

References

External links
 
Text of the Resolution at undocs.org

 0747
1992 in Angola
 0747
March 1992 events